}}
Katelin Guregian ( Snyder; August 16, 1987 in Nashua, New Hampshire) is an American national rowing team coxswain. She is a five-time world champion and an Olympic gold medallist.

She attended Winter Park High School and rowed for Winter Park Crew.

She coxed the University of Washington men's eight in college to multiple victories, and has since moved on to the international level. She coxed the US Women's 8+ to a gold medal at the 2016 Summer Olympics. In 2013, Snyder coxed the U.S. Women's eight to a world record of 5:54.16 at the Rowing World Cup III in Lucerne, Switzerland.

She has qualified to represent the United States at the 2020 Summer Olympics.

Competitive history

Senior

Private life
Snyder met her future husband, Nareg Guregian, during the summer of 2013 at a training camp. They got engaged in 2015 and married towards the end of 2016. 
Snyder adopted dog Olly, December 22, 2018.

References

External links

American female rowers
Sportspeople from Winter Park, Florida
Living people
Sportspeople from Nashua, New Hampshire
1987 births
Coxswains (rowing)
World Rowing Championships medalists for the United States
Rowers at the 2016 Summer Olympics
Rowers at the 2020 Summer Olympics
Olympic gold medalists for the United States in rowing
Medalists at the 2016 Summer Olympics
Winter Park High School alumni
Washington Huskies women's rowers
21st-century American women